Anderson is a city in Shasta County, California, approximately 10 miles south of Redding. Its population is 11,323 as of the 2020 census, up from 9,932 from the 2010 census.

Located 138 miles north of Sacramento, the city's roots are as a railroad town near the northern tip of the Central Valley of California.

The city was named after ranch owner Elias Anderson who granted the Oregon and California Railroad trackage rights and land for a station.  Elias Anderson was a farmer, hotel owner, and postmaster. Elias married Elizabeth Summers in 1839 and built the Prairie House in the community of Cottonwood in 1856 on the south side of Cottonwood Creek (now Tehama County).

Elias Anderson purchased the American Ranch from Thomas Freeman in 1856 and built the American Ranch Hotel in what would become downtown Anderson, California.  The post office was inside the hotel. Elias Anderson purchased 210 acres from Pierson B. Reading in 1865 and deeded a right-of-way through his property to Central Pacific Railroad in 1872; in return the railroad gave the depot his name. Elias and Elizabeth Anderson built their new home at 2865 East Street in 1873; it no longer exists. While it stood, the house was designated as California Historical Landmark No. 12. In 1876 the Andersons moved their ranch hotel to the corner of Main and Ferry Streets.

History

Railroad activity came to the area in 1872. Anderson is named after Elias Anderson, who owned the largest land grant in the vicinity. The city's Anderson River Park sits on part of the original land grant owned by Anderson.

Geography

Climate
According to the Köppen Climate Classification system, Anderson has a Hot-summer Mediterranean climate, abbreviated "Csa" on climate maps.

Demographics

2010
At the 2010 census Anderson had a population of 9,932. The racial makeup of Anderson was 8,273 (83.3%) White, 70 (0.7%) African American, 426 (4.3%) Native American, 256 (2.6%) Asian, 17 (0.2%) Pacific Islander, 353 (3.6%) from other races, and 537 (5.4%) from two or more races. Hispanic or Latino of any race were 1,070 persons (10.8%).

The census reported that 9,920 people (99.9% of the population) lived in households, 12 (0.1%) lived in non-institutionalized group quarters, and no one was institutionalized.

There were 3,944 households, 1,453 (36.8%) had children under the age of 18 living in them, 1,503 (38.1%) were opposite-sex married couples living together, 771 (19.5%) had a female householder with no husband present, 254 (6.4%) had a male householder with no wife present.  There were 364 (9.2%) unmarried opposite-sex partnerships, and 25 (0.6%) same-sex married couples or partnerships. 1,163 households (29.5%) were one person and 490 (12.4%) had someone living alone who was 65 or older. The average household size was 2.52.  There were 2,528 families (64.1% of households); the average family size was 3.07.

The age distribution was 2,746 people (27.6%) under the age of 18, 934 people (9.4%) aged 18 to 24, 2,565 people (25.8%) aged 25 to 44, 2,420 people (24.4%) aged 45 to 64, and 1,267 people (12.8%) who were 65 or older.  The median age was 34.1 years. For every 100 females, there were 87.6 males.  For every 100 females age 18 and over, there were 82.2 males.

There were 4,211 housing units at an average density of 636.1 per square mile, of the occupied units 1,888 (47.9%) were owner-occupied and 2,056 (52.1%) were rented. The homeowner vacancy rate was 2.8%; the rental vacancy rate was 4.6%.  4,727 people (47.6% of the population) lived in owner-occupied housing units and 5,193 people (52.3%) lived in rental housing units.

2000
At the 2000 census there were 9,022 people in 3,372 households, including 2,319 families, in the city. The racial makeup of the city was 86.51% White, 0.62% African American, 4.13% Native American, 1.77% Asian, 0.12% Pacific Islander, 2.33% from other races, and 4.51% from two or more races. Hispanic or Latino of any race were 7.30%.

Of the 3,372 households 39.3% had children under the age of 18 living with them, 42.6% were married couples living together, 20.2% had a female householder with no husband present, and 31.2% were non-families. 26.5% of households were one person and 12.0% were one person aged 65 or older.  The average household size was 2.64 and the average family size was 3.14.

The age distribution was 31.6% under the age of 18, 9.2% from 18 to 24, 27.1% from 25 to 44, 18.3% from 45 to 64, and 13.9% 65 or older.  The median age was 32 years. For every 100 females, there were 87.4 males.  For every 100 females age 18 and over, there were 79.6 males.

The median income for a household in the city was $24,558, and the median family income  was $29,259. Males had a median income of $28,074 versus $20,745 for females. The per capita income for the city was $11,744.  About 22.2% of families and 28.3% of the population were below the poverty line, including 43.3% of those under age 18 and 9.5% of those age 65 or over.

According to a 2006 estimate, the population is 10,677.  The report by the California Department of Finance lists the annual percentage change population estimate at 1.4%.

In 2007, the population dropped from 10,677 to 10,580.

In areas north of Anderson, 4,036 live in unincorporated urban areas along Highway 273. Another 8,342 live in rural areas, including at least 3,500 people in the communities of Olinda and Happy Valley, which is west of Anderson and southwest of Redding. A total of 21,400 people live in the entire Anderson area, including Olinda, Happy Valley, and some areas south of Churn Creek Bottom.

Politics

Economy

Education

High schools
 Anderson Union High School
 North Valley High School
 Anderson New Technology High School

Elementary schools
 Anderson Heights Elementary School
 Anderson Middle School
 Northern Summit Academy
 Meadow Lane Elementary

Recreation
The city is home to Anderson River Park, North Volonte Park, and South Volonte Park.

Anderson River Park
Anderson River Park is located off of Stingy Ln. down Rupert Rd. The park is situated on the Sacramento River. The park consists of athletic fields, picnic areas, fishing access, play structures, and a disc golf course.

In Fall 2020, the City added River Splash a Splash pad, Shasta County's newest water play park to the Park.  River Splash has three large shade structures, picnic tables, seating, lawn areas, restrooms, and a 106-feet diameter water play area.  The water features include above-ground items such as water spray tunnels, a tipping bucket of water and water jets.  All 35 water jets that are cast into the concrete play area have LED lights that are timed with the water spray.

North Volonte Park
North Volonte Park is located off South St. on Emily Rd. North Volonte Park is separated from South Volonte Park. North Volonte Park is a developed park which consists of softball and baseball fields. It also has a skate park.

South Volonte Park
South Volonte Park is located behind North Volonte Park. South Volonte Park is wetlands that are outlined by a jogging trail. It also contains exercise equipment.

References

External links

 Official City Website
 Anderson Union High School District
Images of Anderson from the Eastman’s Originals Collection,  Special Collections Dept., University of California, Davis.

1956 establishments in California
Cities in Shasta County, California
Incorporated cities and towns in California
Populated places on the Sacramento River